This is a list of the chapters and volumes of the seinen manga series Excel Saga by Rikdo Koshi. The chapters began serialization in Young King Ours in September 1996, and ended in 2011. The individual chapters are collected and published in 27 tankōbon volumes by Shōnen Gahosha between April 1997 and October 2011. The manga was partly adapted into a twenty-six episode anime by J.C.Staff which aired on TV Tokyo in Japan from October 7, 1999 to March 30, 2000.

Viz Media licensed Excel Saga for an English language release in North America in 2003. Viz released the first volume on August 13, 2003, and has released all twenty-seven volumes of the series by January 2014. It is also licensed for regional language releases in France by Kabuto and in Italy by Dynit.



List of volumes

References

Excel Saga
Excel Saga